Waldfischbach-Burgalben is a municipality in the Südwestpfalz district, in Rhineland-Palatinate, Germany. It is situated on the western edge of the Palatinate forest, approx. 10 km northeast of Pirmasens. Waldfischbach-Burgalben is also located near Pulaski Barracks, Kapaun and Vogelweh Air Force Base.

Waldfischbach-Burgalben is the seat of the Verbandsgemeinde ("collective municipality") Waldfischbach-Burgalben.

This town is twinned with Carentan, in Lower Normandy (France).

References

Palatinate Forest
Südwestpfalz
Palatinate (region)